Hwanghae Province (Hwanghae-do ) was one of the Eight Provinces of Korea during the Joseon era. Hwanghae was located in the northwest of Korea. The provincial capital was Haeju. The regional name for the province was Haeseo.

History
In 1395, the province was organized as Punghae.  In 1417, the province was renamed Hwanghae. The name derived from the names of the two principal cities of Hwangju and Haeju ).

In 1895, the province was reorganized into the Districts of Haeju in the west and Gaeseong in the east, but in 1896, a new system of thirteen provinces was established, and Hwanghae Province was reconstituted.

In 1945, Korea was divided into Soviet and American zones of occupation, north and south respectively of the 38th parallel. The southernmost part of Hwanghae (around the towns of Ongjin and Yonan County) was cut off from the rest of the province by the dividing line and joined Gyeonggi Province in the southern half of the country. In 1948, Hwanghae and Gyeonggi Provinces became parts of the new countries of North and South Korea respectively.

In 1953, at the end of the Korean War, the Northern Limit Line was established, which marked the maritime boundary between North and South Korea. The line runs between the mainland portion of Gyeonggi Province that had been part of Hwanghae before 1945, and the adjacent offshore islands (the largest of which is Baengnyeongdo). As a result, the mainland portion reverted to North Korean control, while the islands remained a part of South Korea.  (Since 1999, North Korea has claimed a more southerly Maritime Military Demarcation Line, which would make the islands a part of North Korea as well. Disputes between North and South Korean naval vessels often occur in this area.)

In 1954, North Korea's Hwanghae Province was divided into North and South Hwanghae Provinces.

Geography
Hwanghae was bounded by Pyeongan Province (after 1896 South Pyeongan) on the north, Gangwon Province on the east, Gyeonggi Province on the south, and the Yellow Sea on the west.

See also
Kōkai-dō

External links

 Seoul City history article on Hanseong and 22 other late 19th-century districts (in Korean)

Provinces of Korea
Joseon dynasty
Divided regions